The 1981–82 Iraqi National Clubs First Division was the 8th season of the competition since its foundation in 1974. Al-Talaba won their second league title in a row, finishing two points ahead of Al-Tayaran at the top of the table.

League table

Results

Top scorers

References

External links
 Iraq Football Association

Iraqi Premier League seasons
1981–82 in Iraqi football
Iraq